Solomon Schechter High School of New York was a coeducational Jewish high school located in the New York City borough of Manhattan. The school, which was affiliated with the Conservative Movement of Judaism and a member of the Solomon Schechter Day School Association, merged in 2006 with the New Jersey-based Schechter Regional High School, to form the Metro Schechter Academy, which in turn closed permanently in 2007. SSHSNY was a laboratory school of the Jewish Theological Seminary, and provided students with a dual general and Judaic studies curriculum.

Curriculum
The school's core curriculum included studies in English, history, math, science, Hebrew, Tanakh (Bible), and Talmud. In addition, students learned a foreign language (French, Spanish, and at one point, Japanese), the arts, and physical education. A high priority was placed on scientific inquiry, on integrating Jewish and general studies, and on promoting Hebrew both as a living language and as a portal to advanced Jewish study. The core curriculum was complemented by a variety of elective courses in the arts and sciences.

Extracurricular activities
Extracurricular activities included student government, mock trial, debate, yearbook, and sports teams (cross country, soccer, volleyball, basketball, soccer, softball). Community service was an integral part of the school program, and was required for all students in grades 10 and 11.

External links
National Center for Education Statistics data for the Solomon Schechter High School of New York

Conservative Jewish day schools
Conservative Judaism in New York (state)
Defunct schools in New York City
Jewish day schools in New York (state)